Rolf Back (13 May 1928 – 6 August 2009) was a Finnish sprinter. He competed in the men's 400 metres at the 1952 Summer Olympics.

References

1928 births
2009 deaths
Athletes (track and field) at the 1952 Summer Olympics
Finnish male sprinters
Olympic athletes of Finland
Place of birth missing